The Kwicky Koala Show is a 30-minute Saturday-morning cartoon produced by Hanna-Barbera Productions and Hanna Barbera Pty, Ltd. that aired on CBS from September 12 to December 26, 1981. This series is notable for being among cartoon director Tex Avery's final works; he died during production in 1980. As it was produced in Australia, the Cartoon Network and later Boomerang broadcasts were sourced from PAL masters, rather than NTSC masters like many other Hanna-Barbera productions. Each segment has also been shown separately as filler between shows on Boomerang.

The Kwicky Koala Show contained four short segments: Kwicky Koala, The Bungle Brothers, Crazy Claws and Dirty Dawg.

Segments

Kwicky Koala
Kwicky Koala (voiced by writer Bob Ogle) is similar to Avery's Droopy, except that Kwicky can escape his pursuer Wilford Wolf (voiced by John Stephenson), who closely resembles the earlier Hanna-Barbera character Mildew Wolf (to the point that Stephenson impersonates Mildew's voice actor Paul Lynde for Wilford). The difference is that Kwicky moves at super-speed, which looks more like vanishing into thin air with an accompanying "beep" sound effect, much like Speedy Gonzales (the animation shortcut used to facilitate this often went to extremes by making Kwicky disappear from one spot and reappear instantly in the next, with no intermediate smear frames).

Episodes

The Bungle Brothers
A pair of beagles named George (voiced by Michael Bell) and Joey (voiced by Allan Melvin) seek vaudeville stardom. This segment is mostly short wraparounds.

Episodes

Crazy Claws
A wildcat named Crazy Claws (voiced by Jim MacGeorge impersonating Groucho Marx) uses his sharp wits and equally sharp claws to evade the fur trapper Rawhide Clyde (voiced by Don Messick) and his dog Bristletooth (voiced by Peter Cullen) in a U.S. National Park run by Ranger Rangerfield (voiced by Michael Bell).

Episodes

Dirty Dawg
A vagrant Labrador Retriever named Dirty Dawg (voiced by Frank Welker impersonating Howard Cosell) seeks to improve life for himself and his friend Ratso the Rat (voiced by Marshall Efron) while staying ahead of a police officer named Officer Bullhorn (voiced by Matthew Faison).

Episodes

Cast
 Michael Bell as George, Ranger Rangerfield
 Peter Cullen as Bristletooth
 Marshall Efron as Ratso
 Matthew Faison as Officer Bullhorn
 Jim MacGeorge as Crazy Claws
 Allan Melvin as Joey
 Don Messick as Rawhide Clyde
 Bob Ogle as Kwicky Koala
 John Stephenson as Wilford Wolf
 Frank Welker as Dirty Dawg

Additional voices
 Marlene Aragon
 Joe Baker
 Jered Barclay
 Hamilton Camp
 Henry Corden
 Jack DeLeon
 Joan Gerber
 Danny Goldman
 Bob Holt
 Annie Potts
 Paul Ross
 Bob Sarlatte
 Marilyn Schreffler
 Hal Smith
 Lennie Weinrib

Home media
A VHS release of the series was issued by Worldvision Home Video during the late 1980s, and several episodes were released on DVD by Warner Home Video as part of Saturday Morning Cartoons: The 1980s Collection, Volume 1 on May 4, 2010. The episodes on this set are "Dry Run", "Robinson Caruso", "High Roller", "The Claws Conspiracy", "Hat Dance" and "Dirty's Debut".

On October 11, 2016, Warner Archive released The Kwicky Koala Show: The Complete Series on DVD in region 1 for the very first time, as part of their Hanna-Barbera Classics Collection. This is a Manufacture-on-Demand (MOD) release, available exclusively through Warner's online store and Amazon.com.

Other appearances
 In the Cartoon Network bumper "Sick Days", a majority of cartoon characters call in sick to work, resulting in a programming problem due to the talent shortage. The result was CN airing a 24-hour Kwicky Koala Marathon, much to the viewers' dismay.
 Kwicky Koala makes some cameo appearances in Harvey Birdman, Attorney at Law. He appears as a tattoo in the episode "Deadomutt Part 2". He also appears in "SPF", where he, along with Dirty Dawg, appears as one of the victims of Cybersquatting, and in "The Death of Harvey" during the riots, laying in a road crater and moving his head. Additionally, Officer Bullhorn appears as a jury candidate in "Juror in Court".
 Kwicky Koala and Dirty Dawg make appearances in Jellystone! with Kwicky Koala voiced by Paul F. Tompkins and Dirty Dawg voiced by Jeff Bergman. Dirty Dawg was seen in the episode "It's a Mad Mad Mad Rat Race" where he works as a caricature artist and is an old friend of Lippy the Lion and Hardy Har Har.

References

External links
 
 
 Kwicky Koala at Don Markstein's Toonopedia. Archived from the original on December 2, 2015.

1980s American animated television series
1980s American anthology television series
1981 American television series debuts
1981 American television series endings
1981 Australian television series debuts
1981 Australian television series endings
Television series about koalas
Fictional characters who can teleport
Fictional characters who can move at superhuman speeds
CBS original programming
Television series by Endemol Australia
Television series by Hanna-Barbera
American children's animated anthology television series
American children's animated comedy television series
Australian children's animated comedy television series